Anderson Oliveira may refer to:
Anderson Oliveira (canoeist) (born 1992), Brazilian canoeist
Anderson Oliveira (footballer, born 1998), Brazilian footballer
Anderson (footballer, born 1988) (Anderson Luís de Abreu Oliveira), Brazilian footballer

See also 
Anderson Oliveira Almeida (born 1980), Brazilian footballer